Adam Lynn Duvall (born September 4, 1988) is an American professional baseball outfielder for the Boston Red Sox of Major League Baseball (MLB). He has previously played in MLB for the San Francisco Giants, Cincinnati Reds, Miami Marlins and Atlanta Braves. Duvall played college baseball at the University of Louisville. Duvall was drafted by the San Francisco Giants in the 11th round of the 2010 MLB draft. He made his MLB debut in 2014. He was an All-Star in 2016.

Early life
Duvall was born on September 4, 1988, to parents Jeana and Alvin. He has a brother, Austin. Duvall was raised in Louisville, Kentucky, and  played baseball at Butler High School. In his junior high school season, he sustained a cracked vertebra. A subsequent surgery prevented him from playing during his senior year of high school.

Duvall played college baseball at Western Kentucky University, Chipola College, and the University of Louisville.

Minor leagues
Duvall was drafted by the San Francisco Giants in the 11th round of the 2010 Major League Baseball draft. He signed and made his professional debut that season for the Salem-Keizer Volcanoes. In 54 games, he batted .245 with four home runs and 18 RBIs. He spent 2011 with the Augusta GreenJackets where he slashed .285/.385/.527 with 22 home runs and 87 RBIs in 116 games.

In 2012, he played for the San Jose Giants where he batted .258 and led all Class A players with 30 home runs along with 100 RBIs.

Duvall spent the 2013 season with the Richmond Flying Squirrels, tallying a .252 average, 17 home runs, and 58 RBIs over 105 games. He was out of the lineup for part of April and May after sustaining an injury to his left thumb. Following the season, Duvall was added to the 40-man roster on November 20, 2013. He started the 2014 season with the Triple-A Fresno Grizzlies.

Major leagues

San Francisco Giants
The Giants promoted Duvall to the major leagues on June 25, 2014. In his first MLB game, Duvall hit a home run off Cincinnati Reds pitcher Mike Leake. He was sent back down to the Grizzlies on July 4 due to the return of Brandon Belt from the disabled list (DL). When Belt was sent back to the DL due to lingering concussion symptoms, Duvall was called back up to the Giants to play first base, alongside Travis Ishikawa, Buster Posey, and Michael Morse. On September 28, Duvall homered off San Diego Padres pitcher Tim Stauffer for his first career pinch–hit home run. Over the course of 2014, Duvall played in 28 games with the Giants, finishing with a .192 batting average, three home runs, and five RBIs. The Giants earned a wild card spot with an 88–74 record and eventually won the 2014 World Series over the Kansas City Royals. Duvall, however, did not make any appearances in the postseason. He began 2015 with the Sacramento River Cats.

Cincinnati Reds
On July 30, 2015, the Giants traded Duvall and Keury Mella to the Reds for Leake. Following the trade, Duvall joined the Louisville Bats. On August 31, Duvall was recalled by the Reds to replace an injured Brennan Boesch. As a pinch-hitter, Duvall homered in his first at bat with the Reds. Splitting time between Louisville and Cincinnati, Duvall played in 27 games with the Reds. He posted a .219 batting average, five home runs, and nine RBIs for the Reds.

In 2016, Duvall was included on the Reds' opening day roster. By June, he led the NL in slugging percentage and was tied for first in MLB in home runs. He was selected to the 2016 Major League Baseball All-Star Game as a reserve. Duvall was the first University of Louisville alumnus to become an MLB All-Star. He also participated in the 2016 MLB Home Run Derby, losing to 2015 derby champion Todd Frazier in the semifinals. In his first full season in the majors, Duvall played in 150 games and posted a .241 batting average, 33 home runs, and 103 RBIs.

On April 18, 2017, Duvall hit his first career grand slam off of Kevin Gausman as the Reds won 9–3 over the Baltimore Orioles. On July 14, with the bases loaded, Duvall hit his first career walk-off in the 11th inning off of T. J. McFarland of the Diamondbacks to give Cincinnati a 4–3 victory. Duvall finished 2017 with a .249/.301/.480 slash line to go along with 31 home runs and 99 runs batted in. On May 9, 2018, Duvall hit his first career walk-off home run off A. J. Ramos against the New York Mets to give the Reds a 2–1 victory.

Atlanta Braves
On July 30, 2018, Duvall was traded to the Atlanta Braves in exchange for Lucas Sims, Matt Wisler, and Preston Tucker.
Duvall struggled in 2018 with the Braves, batting .132 with no home runs or RBIs. In both Atlanta and Cincinnati, Duvall batted just .195 with 15 homers and 61 RBIs.

In 2019, Duvall hit .267/.315/.567 with 10 home runs and 19 RBIs in 120 at bats in 41 games for Atlanta.

Duvall and Marcell Ozuna became the first teammates in Major League Baseball history to hit three home runs in consecutive games, when Duvall did so against the Boston Red Sox on September 2, 2020. Ozuna's equivalent feat the previous day was the first time a National League player had hit three home runs in a game at Fenway Park. On September 9, Duvall hit three home runs in a game for the second time, while facing the Miami Marlins. He became the first player in franchise history to have hit three home runs in a game twice. He drove in nine runs, on a two-run home run followed by a three-run home run, then a grand slam. In doing so, Duvall was the first player in Major League Baseball history to hit those home runs in such an order.

In 2020 he batted .237/.301/.532 with 34 runs, 16 home runs (3rd in the NL), and 33 RBIs in 190 at bats, and was third in the NL in at bats per home run (11.9). On December 2, Duvall was nontendered by the Braves.

Miami Marlins
On February 9, 2021, Duvall signed a one-year, $2 million contract with the Miami Marlins.

Atlanta Braves (second stint)
On July 30, 2021, Duvall was traded to the Atlanta Braves for Alex Jackson. Following the completion of a suspended game against the Braves and San Diego Padres on September 24, 2021, Duvall and Daniel Hudson became the first players in Major League Baseball history to play in two games for four different teams on the same day. Duvall and Hudson were members of the Miami Marlins and Washington Nationals, respectively, when the teams faced each other on July 21, 2021. The Braves–Padres game on that same day had been suspended, and by the time it resumed on September 24, 2021, Hudson had joined the Padres and Duvall the Braves.

In 2021, Duvall batted .228/.281/.491 with 38 home runs and 174 strikeouts and led the National League with 113 runs batted in. He had the highest fly ball percentage in the major leagues, at 52.69%.

In Game 5 of the 2021 World Series, he hit a two-out, first-inning grand slam on the first pitch from starting pitcher Framber Valdez, giving the Braves a 4–0 lead. Despite his efforts, the Braves lost 5–9, sending the series to Game 6. Nevertheless, the Braves won Game 6, giving the Braves their first title since 1995 and Duvall's first career World Series championship. At the end of the season, Duvall won the National League Gold Glove Award for right field.

The Braves tendered Duvall a contract in December 2021. His salary for the 2022 season was decided by the arbitration process. He asked for $10.275 million and received $9.275 million. While pursuing a foul ball during a game against the Los Angeles Angels on July 23, Duvall tore the tendon sheath in his left wrist. The injury required surgery, which ended his season.

Boston Red Sox
On January 24, 2023, Duvall signed a one-year contract with the Boston Red Sox, reportedly worth $7 million with an additional $3 million possible via potential bonuses.

Personal life
Duvall was diagnosed with type 1 diabetes in 2012.
He married his wife, Michelle in 2017. They have two sons. They reside in both Nashville and Pinecrest, Florida.

References

External links

Louisville Cardinals bio

1988 births
Living people
National League All-Stars
National League RBI champions
Baseball players from Louisville, Kentucky
Major League Baseball first basemen
San Francisco Giants players
Cincinnati Reds players
Atlanta Braves players
Miami Marlins players
Western Kentucky Hilltoppers baseball players
Chipola Indians baseball players
Louisville Cardinals baseball players
Salem-Keizer Volcanoes players
Augusta GreenJackets players
San Jose Giants players
Richmond Flying Squirrels players
Fresno Grizzlies players
Bravos de Margarita players
American expatriate baseball players in Venezuela
Sacramento River Cats players
Louisville Bats players
Gwinnett Stripers players
Butler High School alumni
People with type 1 diabetes
Major League Baseball outfielders
Gold Glove Award winners